Frank Keenan (born James Francis Keenan; April 8, 1858 – February 24, 1929) was an American stage and film actor and stage director and manager during the silent-film era. He was among the first stage actors to star in Hollywood, and he pursued work in film features for a number of years.

Early life
Born to Irish Catholic parents in Dubuque, Iowa, Keenan acquired his education both there and at Boston College.

Career

In New York, he became a star, a celebrated Shakespearean actor who later specialized in King Lear. He was a noted Broadway matinee idol, and his name appeared at the top of showbills. He acted in such hits as The Capitol, A Poor Relation and The Girl of the Golden West. He played the title role in Macbeth opposite Nance O'Neil. At one point, he briefly operated his own theater, the Berkeley Lyceum in New York, which brought him recognition as both actor and director.

Keenan made his screen debut under the direction of Reginald Barker in The Coward (1915). His career lasted into his late 60s, and he was a leader in the Actors' Equity Association. His last stage appearance, at 68, was as a Southern colonel in Black Velvet.

Family
Keenan was married for many years to Katherine Agnes Long, who often acted with him. The Keenans had two daughters, Frances and Hilda, both of whom were stage and film actresses. His wife Katherine died in 1924; the same year, he married a young music teacher, Margaret White, from Los Angeles, but divorced her in 1927. By October 1928, at age 70, Frank Keenan remarried again, to a 41-year-old actress, Leah May from Atlanta, Georgia. By daughter Hilda he was the grandfather of actor Keenan Wynn and, in turn, the great-great grandfather of actor and writer Ned Wynn (born Edmond Keenan Wynn), multiple Emmy Award winning screenwriter Tracy Keenan Wynn, and actress Jessica Keenan Wynn.

Filmography

Actor
Camille (1926)
 The Gilded Butterfly (1926)
When the Door Opened (1925)
East Lynne (1925)
My Lady's Lips (1925)
The Dixie Handicap (1924)
Women Who Give (1924) 
Scars of Jealousy (1923)
Brass (1923)
Hearts Aflame (1923)
Lorna Doone (1922) 
Dollar for Dollar (1920) 
Smoldering Embers (1920) 
Brothers Divided (1919) 
The False Code (1919)
The World Aflame (1919)
The Master Man (1919)
Gates of Brass (1919)
The Silver Girl (1919)
Todd of the Times (1919)
The Midnight Stage (1919)
The Bells (1918)
More Trouble (1918)
Ruler of the Road (1918)
Loaded Dice (1918)
Public Defender (1917)
The Crab (1917)
The Bride of Hate (1917)
 "War's Women" (1916)
The Sin Ye Do (1916)
Jim Grimsby's Boy (1916)
The Thoroughbred (1916)
Honor Thy Name (1916)
The Phantom (1916)
The Stepping Stone (1916)
The Despoiler (1915)
The Long Chance (1915)
The Coward (1915)
Desert Thieves (1914)
Love vs Duty (1914)
The Bells of Asti (1914) 
The Hunchback
The Fisherman; Or, Men Must Work and Women Must Weep (1909) 
Judge Not That Ye Be Not Judged (1909)

Director
Dollar for Dollar (1920)
 Smoldering Embers (1920)
Brothers Divided (1919)
The Silver Girl (1919)

Producer
Brothers Divided (1919)

Writer
The World Aflame (1919)

Stageplays
Sherlock Holmes (1928)
Peter Weston (1923)
Hon. John Grigsby (1902)
At the Threshold (1905)
Strolling Players (1905)
The System of Dr. Tarr (1905)
The Lady Bookie (1905)
The Lady Across the Hall (1905)
A Passion in the Suburb (1905)
The Cardinal's Edict (1905)
A Woman's Pity (1905)
The Warrens of Virginia (1907)

Death
Keenan died of pneumonia in his Hollywood mansion, and is buried next to his first wife at Hollywood Forever Cemetery.

References

External links

1858 births
1929 deaths
Male actors from Iowa
American male silent film actors
American male stage actors
American people of Irish descent
Boston College alumni
Burials at Hollywood Forever Cemetery
People from Dubuque, Iowa
Vaudeville performers
20th-century American male actors
Deaths from pneumonia in California
Catholics from Iowa